

Events

Pre-1600
 533 – Vandalic War: Byzantine general Belisarius defeats the Vandals, commanded by King Gelimer, at the Battle of Tricamarum.
 687 – Pope Sergius I is elected as a compromise between antipopes Paschal and Theodore.
1025 – Constantine VIII becomes sole emperor of the Byzantine Empire, 63 years after being crowned co-emperor.
1161 – Jin–Song wars: Military officers conspire against the emperor Wanyan Liang of the Jin dynasty after a military defeat at the Battle of Caishi, and assassinate the emperor at his camp.
1167 – Sicilian Chancellor Stephen du Perche moves the royal court to Messina to prevent a rebellion.
1256 – Mongol forces under Hulagu enter and dismantle the Nizari Ismaili (Assassin) stronghold at Alamut Castle (in present-day Iran) as part of their offensive on Islamic southwest Asia.
1270 – The Nizari Ismaili garrison of Gerdkuh, Persia surrender after 17 years to the Mongols.
1467 – Stephen III of Moldavia defeats Matthias Corvinus of Hungary, with the latter being injured thrice, at the Battle of Baia.
1546 – The town of Ekenäs is founded by King Gustav Vasa of Sweden.

1601–1900
1651 – Castle Cornet in Guernsey, the last stronghold which had supported the King in the Third English Civil War, surrenders.
1778 – American Revolutionary War: British and French fleets clash in the Battle of St. Lucia.
1791 – The United States Bill of Rights becomes law when ratified by the Virginia General Assembly.
1836 – The U.S. Patent Office building in Washington, D.C., nearly burns to the ground, destroying all 9,957 patents issued by the federal government to that date, as well as 7,000 related patent models.
1864 – American Civil War: The Battle of Nashville begins at Nashville, Tennessee, and ends the following day with the destruction of the Confederate Army of Tennessee as a fighting force by the Union Army of the Cumberland.
1869 – The short-lived Republic of Ezo is proclaimed in the Ezo area of Japan. It is the first attempt to establish a democracy in Japan.
1871 – Sixteen-year-old telegraphist Ella Stewart keys and sends the first telegraphed message from Arizona Territory at the Deseret Telegraph Company office in Pipe Spring.
1890 – Hunkpapa Lakota leader Sitting Bull is killed on Standing Rock Indian Reservation, leading to the Wounded Knee Massacre.
1893 – Symphony No. 9 ("From the New World"  the "New World Symphony") by Antonín Dvořák premieres in a public afternoon rehearsal at Carnegie Hall in New York City, followed by a concert premiere on the evening of December 16.
1899 – British Army forces are defeated at the Battle of Colenso in Natal, South Africa, the third and final battle fought during the Black Week of the Second Boer War.

1901–present
1903 – Italian American food cart vendor Italo Marchiony receives a U.S. patent for inventing a machine that makes ice cream cones.
1905 – The Pushkin House is established in Saint Petersburg, Russia, to preserve the cultural heritage of Alexander Pushkin.
1906 – The London Underground's Great Northern, Piccadilly and Brompton Railway opens.
1914 – World War I: The Serbian Army recaptures Belgrade from the invading Austro-Hungarian Army.
  1914   – A gas explosion at Mitsubishi Hōjō coal mine, in Kyushu, Japan, kills 687.
1917 – World War I: An armistice between Russia and the Central Powers is signed.
1939 – Gone with the Wind (highest inflation adjusted grossing film) receives its premiere at Loew's Grand Theatre in Atlanta, Georgia, United States.
1941 – The Holocaust in Ukraine: German troops murder over 15,000 Jews at Drobytsky Yar, a ravine southeast of the city of Kharkiv.
1942 – World War II: The Battle of Mount Austen, the Galloping Horse, and the Sea Horse begins during the Guadalcanal Campaign.
1943 – World War II: The Battle of Arawe begins during the New Britain campaign.
1944 – World War II: a single-engine UC-64A Norseman aeroplane carrying United States Army Air Forces Major Glenn Miller is lost in a flight over the English Channel.
1945 – Occupation of Japan/Shinto Directive: General Douglas MacArthur orders that Shinto be abolished as the state religion of Japan.
1960 – Richard Pavlick is arrested for plotting to assassinate U.S. President-Elect John F. Kennedy.
  1960   – King Mahendra of Nepal suspends the country's constitution, dissolves parliament, dismisses the cabinet, and imposes direct rule.
1961 – Adolf Eichmann is sentenced to death after being found guilty by an Israeli court of 15 criminal charges, including charges of crimes against humanity, crimes against the Jewish people, and membership of an outlawed organization.
1965 – Project Gemini: Gemini 6A, crewed by Wally Schirra and Thomas Stafford, is launched from Cape Kennedy, Florida. Four orbits later, it achieves the first space rendezvous, with Gemini 7.
1970 – Soviet spacecraft Venera 7 successfully lands on Venus. It is the first successful soft landing on another planet.
1973 – John Paul Getty III, grandson of American billionaire J. Paul Getty, is found alive near Naples, Italy, after being kidnapped by an Italian gang on July 10.
  1973   – The American Psychiatric Association votes 13–0 to remove homosexuality from its official list of psychiatric disorders, the Diagnostic and Statistical Manual of Mental Disorders.
1978 – U.S. President Jimmy Carter announces that the United States will recognize the People's Republic of China and sever diplomatic relations with the Republic of China (Taiwan).
1981 – A suicide car bombing targeting the Iraqi embassy in Beirut, Lebanon, levels the embassy and kills 61 people, including Iraq's ambassador to Lebanon. The attack is considered the first modern suicide bombing.
1989 – Second Optional Protocol to the International Covenant on Civil and Political Rights relating the abolition of capital punishment is adopted.
1993 – The Troubles: The Downing Street Declaration is issued by British Prime Minister John Major and Irish Taoiseach Albert Reynolds.
1997 – Tajikistan Airlines Flight 3183 crashes in the desert near Sharjah, United Arab Emirates, killing 85.
2000 – The third reactor at the Chernobyl Nuclear Power Plant is shut down.
2001 – The Leaning Tower of Pisa reopens after 11 years and $27,000,000 spent to stabilize it, without fixing its famous lean.
2005 – Introduction of the Lockheed Martin F-22 Raptor into USAF active service.
2010 – A boat carrying 90 asylum seekers crashes into rocks off the coast of Christmas Island, Australia, killing 48 people.
2013 – The South Sudanese Civil War begins when opposition leaders Dr. Riek Machar, Pagan Amum and Rebecca Nyandeng vote to boycott the meeting of the National Liberation Council at Nyakuron.
2014 – Gunman Man Haron Monis takes 18 hostages inside a café in Martin Place for 16 hours in Sydney. Monis and two hostages are killed when police raid the café the following morning.
2017 – A 6.5earthquake strikes the Indonesian island of Java in the city of Tasikmalaya, resulting in four deaths.

Births

Pre-1600
AD 37 – Nero, Roman emperor (d. 68)
130 – Lucius Verus, Roman emperor (d. 169)
1242 – Prince Munetaka, Japanese shōgun (d. 1274)
1447 – Albert IV, Duke of Bavaria (d. 1508)
1567 – Christoph Demantius, German composer, poet, and theorist (d. 1643)

1601–1900
1610 – David Teniers the Younger, Flemish painter (d. 1690)
1657 – Michel Richard Delalande, French organist and composer (d. 1726)
1686 – Jean-Joseph Fiocco, Flemish violinist and composer (d. 1746)
1710 – Francesco Zahra, Maltese painter (d. 1773)
1789 – Carlos Soublette, Venezuelan general and politician, 11th President of Venezuela (d. 1870)
1832 – Gustave Eiffel, French architect and engineer, co-designed the Eiffel Tower (d. 1923)
1837 – E. W. Bullinger, English minister, scholar, and theologian (d. 1913)
1852 – Henri Becquerel, French physicist and chemist, Nobel Prize laureate (d. 1908)
1859 – L. L. Zamenhof, Polish linguist and ophthalmologist, created Esperanto (d. 1917)
1860 – Niels Ryberg Finsen, Faroese-Danish physician and educator, Nobel Prize laureate (d. 1904)
  1860   – Abner Powell, American baseball player and manager (d. 1953)
1861 – Charles Duryea, American engineer and businessman, co-founded the Duryea Motor Wagon Company (d. 1938)
  1861   – Pehr Evind Svinhufvud, Finnish lawyer, judge, and politician, 3rd President of Finland (d. 1944)
1863 – Arthur Dehon Little, American chemist and engineer (d. 1935)
1869 – Leon Marchlewski, Polish chemist and academic (d. 1946)
1875 – Emilio Jacinto, Filipino journalist and activist (d. 1899)
1878 – Hans Carossa, German author and poet (d. 1956)
1885 – Leonid Pitamic, Slovenian lawyer, philosopher, and academic (d. 1971)
1886 – Wanda Krahelska-Filipowicz, Polish politician and resistance fighter (d. 1968)
  1886   – Florence Jepperson Madsen, American contralto singer and professor of music (d. 1977)
1888 – Maxwell Anderson, American journalist and playwright (d. 1959)
1890 – Harry Babcock, American pole vaulter (d. 1965)
1891 – A.P. Carter, American country singer-songwriter and musician (d. 1960)
1892 – J. Paul Getty, American-English businessman and art collector, founded Getty Oil (d. 1976)
1894 – Vibert Douglas, Canadian astrophysicist and astronomer (d. 1988)
  1894   – Josef Imbach, Swiss sprinter (d. 1964)
1896 – Betty Smith, American author and playwright (d. 1972)
1899 – Harold Abrahams, English sprinter, lawyer, and journalist (d. 1978)

1901–present
1902 – Robert F. Bradford, American lawyer and politician, 57th Governor of Massachusetts (d. 1983)
1903 – Tamanishiki San'emon, Japanese sumo wrestler, the 32nd Yokozuna (d. 1938)
1907 – Gordon Douglas, American actor, director, and screenwriter (d. 1993)
  1907   – Oscar Niemeyer, Brazilian architect, designed the United Nations Headquarters and the Cathedral of Brasília (d. 2012)
1908 – Swami Ranganathananda, Indian monk, scholar, and author (d. 2005)
1909 – Sattar Bahlulzade, Azerbaijani-Russian painter (d. 1974)
  1909   – Eliza Atkins Gleason, American librarian (d. 2009)
1910 – John Hammond, American record producer and critic (d. 1987)
1911 – Nicholas P. Dallis, American psychiatrist and illustrator (d. 1991)
  1911   – Stan Kenton, American pianist and composer (d. 1979)
1913 – Roger Gaudry, Canadian chemist and businessman (d. 2001)
  1913   – Muriel Rukeyser, American poet, academic, and activist (d. 1980)
1915 – Eila Campbell, English geographer and cartographer (d. 1994)
1916 – Miguel Arraes, Brazilian lawyer and politician, Governor of Pernambuco (d. 2005)
  1916   – Buddy Cole, American pianist and conductor (d. 1964)
  1916   – Maurice Wilkins, New Zealand-English physicist and biologist, Nobel Prize laureate (d. 2004)
1917 – Shan-ul-Haq Haqqee, Indian-Pakistani linguist and lexicographer (d. 2005)
1918 – Jeff Chandler, American actor (d. 1961)
  1918   – Chihiro Iwasaki, Japanese painter and illustrator (d. 1974)
1919 – Max Yasgur, American dairy farmer and host of the Woodstock Music & Art Fair (d. 1973)
1920 – Gamal al-Banna, Egyptian author and scholar (d. 2013)
  1920   – Kurt Schaffenberger, German-American sergeant and illustrator (d. 2002)
1921 – Alan Freed, American radio host (d. 1965)
1923 – Pierre Cossette, American producer and manager (d. 2009)
  1923   – Freeman Dyson, English-American physicist and mathematician (d. 2020)
  1923   – Uziel Gal, German-Israeli engineer, designed the Uzi gun (d. 2002)
  1923   – Valentin Varennikov, Russian general and politician (d. 2009)
1924 – Frank W. J. Olver, English-American mathematician and academic (d. 2013)
  1924   – Ruhi Sarıalp, Turkish triple jumper and educator (d. 2001)
1925 – Kasey Rogers, American actress and author (d. 2006)
1926 – Bitt Pitt, Australian race car driver (d. 2017) 
1928 – Ernest Ashworth, American singer-songwriter (d. 2009)
  1928   – Ida Haendel, Polish-English violinist and educator (d. 2020)
  1928   – Friedensreich Hundertwasser, Austrian-New Zealand painter and architect (d. 2000)
1930 – Edna O'Brien, Irish novelist, playwright, poet and short story writer
1931 – Klaus Rifbjerg, Danish author and poet (d. 2015)
1932 – Jesse Belvin, American singer-songwriter and pianist (d. 1960)
  1932   – John Meurig Thomas, Welsh chemist and academic (d. 2020)
1933 – Bapu, Indian director and screenwriter (d. 2014)
  1933   – Tim Conway, American comedian, actor, producer, and screenwriter (d. 2019)
  1933   – Donald Woods, South African journalist and activist (d. 2001)
1936 – Joe D'Amato, Italian director and producer (d. 1999)
1938 – Michael Bogdanov, Welsh director and screenwriter (d. 2017)
  1938   – Billy Shaw, American football player
1939 – Cindy Birdsong, American singer-songwriter 
1940 – Nick Buoniconti, American football player and sportscaster (d. 2019)
1942 – Kathleen Blanco, American educator and politician, 54th Governor of Louisiana (d. 2019)
1943 – Lucien den Arend, Dutch sculptor
1944 – Jim Leyland, American baseball player and manager
  1944   – Chico Mendes, Brazilian trade union leader and activist (d. 1988)
1945 – Heather Booth, American civil rights activist, feminist, and political strategist
  1945   – Ivor Crewe, English political scientist and academic
1946 – Carmine Appice, American drummer and songwriter
  1946   – Art Howe, American baseball player and manager
  1946   – Genny Lim, American writer
1948 – Cassandra Harris, Australian actress (d. 1991)
  1948   – Charlie Scott, American basketball player
1949 – Don Johnson, American actor
  1949   – Brian Roper, English economist and academic
1950 – Melanie Chartoff, American actress and comedian 
  1950   – Sylvester James Gates, American theoretical physicist and professor 
1951 – George Donikian, Australian journalist
  1951   – Joe Jordan, Scottish footballer and manager
  1951   – Tim Webster, Australian journalist and sportscaster
1952 – Rudi Protrudi, American singer-songwriter and producer  
  1952   – Allan Simonsen, Danish footballer and manager
  1952   – Julie Taymor, American director, producer, and screenwriter
1953 – John R. Allen, American general and diplomat
  1953   – J. M. DeMatteis, American author
  1953   – Robert Charles Wilson, American-Canadian author
1954 – Alex Cox, English film director, screenwriter, actor, non-fiction author and broadcaster
  1954   – Oliver Heald, English lawyer and politician, Solicitor General for England and Wales
  1954   – Mark Warner, American businessman and politician, 69th Governor of Virginia
1955 – Hector Sants, English banker
  1955   – Paul Simonon, English singer-songwriter and bass player 
1956 – John Lee Hancock, American screenwriter, film director, and producer
  1956   – Tony Leon, South African lawyer and politician
1957 – Mario Marois, Canadian ice hockey player and sportscaster
  1957   – Mike McAlary, American journalist and author (d. 1998)
  1957   – Laura Molina, American singer, guitarist, actress, and painter
  1957   – Tim Reynolds, German-American singer-songwriter and guitarist 
1958 – Carlo J. Caparas, Filipino director and producer
  1958   – Richard Kastle, American classical pianist
1959 – Greg Matthews, Australian cricketer
  1959   – Alan Whetton, New Zealand rugby player
  1959   – Gary Whetton, New Zealand rugby player
1960 – Walter Werzowa, Austrian composer and producer
1961 – Karin Resetarits, Austrian journalist and politician
1962 – Tim Gaines, American bass player 
  1962   – Simon Hodgkinson, English rugby player and coach
1963 – Ellie Cornell, American actress and producer
  1963   – Norman J. Grossfeld, American screenwriter and producer
  1963   – Helen Slater, American actress 
  1963   – David Wingate, American basketball player
1964 – Paul Kaye, British actor
1966 – Carl Hooper, Guyanese cricketer and coach
  1966   – Molly Price, American actress
1967 – David Howells, English footballer and coach
  1967   – Mo Vaughn, American baseball player
1968 – Garrett Wang, American actor
1969 – Ralph Ineson, English actor
  1969   – Chantal Petitclerc, Canadian wheelchair racer and senator
  1969   – Adam Setliff, American discus thrower and lawyer
1970 – Frankie Dettori, Italian jockey
  1970   – Lawrence Funderburke, American basketball player
  1970   – Michael Shanks, Canadian actor, screenwriter and director
1971 – Clint Lowery, American singer-songwriter, guitarist, and producer 
1972 – Rodney Harrison, American football player and sportscaster
  1972   – Lee Jung-jae, South Korean actor
  1972   – Stuart Townsend, Irish actor 
  1972   – Alexandra Tydings, American actress, director, writer and producer
1973 – Surya Bonaly, French figure skater
  1973   – Ryoo Seung-wan, South Korean actor, director, and screenwriter
1974 – Garath Archer, English rugby player
  1974   – P. J. Byrne, American actor
1975 – Samira Saraya,  Palestinian actor, filmmaker, poet and rapper 
1976 – Baichung Bhutia, Indian footballer and manager
  1976   – Kim Eagles, Canadian sport shooter
  1976   – Aaron Miles, American baseball player and coach
  1976   – Todd Tichenor, American baseball player and umpire
1977 – Mehmet Aurélio, Brazilian-Turkish footballer and manager
  1977   – Geoff Stults, American actor and producer
1978 – Ned Brower, American drummer 
  1978   – Mark Jansen, Dutch guitarist and songwriter 
  1978   – Jerome McDougle, American football player
1979 – Adam Brody, American actor
  1979   – Eric Young, Canadian-American wrestler
1980 – Élodie Gossuin, French beauty pageant titleholder and model
  1980   – Sergio Pizzorno, English singer-songwriter and guitarist 
  1980   – Manuel Wilhelm, German rugby player
1981 – Michelle Dockery, English actress 
  1981   – Brendan Fletcher, Canadian actor and screenwriter
  1981   – Andy González, Puerto Rican-American baseball player
  1981   – Thomas Herrion, American football player (d. 2005)
  1981   – Roman Pavlyuchenko, Russian footballer
1982 – Charlie Cox, English actor
  1982   – Borja García, Spanish race car driver
  1982   – Tatiana Perebiynis, Ukrainian tennis player
1983 – Delon Armitage, Trinidadian-English rugby player
  1983   – René Duprée, Canadian professional wrestler
  1983   – Camilla Luddington, English actress
  1983   – Ronnie Radke, American singer-songwriter, guitarist, and producer  
1984 – Martyn Bernard, English high jumper
1985 – Diogo Fernandes, Brazilian footballer
1986 – Kim Junsu, South Korean singer-songwriter and dancer
  1986   – Iveta Mazáčová, Czech sprinter
  1986   – Keylor Navas, Costa Rican footballer
1987 – Josh Norman, American football player
  1986   – Snejana Onopka, Ukrainian model
1988 – Emily Head, English actress
  1988   – Steven Nzonzi, French footballer
1989 – Nichole Bloom, American actress and model
1991 – Conor Daly, American race car driver
1992 – Daiamami Genki, Japanese sumo wrestler
  1992   – Jesse Lingard, English footballer
  1992   – Alex Telles, Brazilian footballer
1996 – Jenifer Brening, German singer
  1996   – Oleksandr Zinchenko, Ukrainian footballer
1997 – Maude Apatow, American actress
  1997   – Zach Banks, American race car driver
  1997   – Magdalena Fręch, Polish tennis player
  1997   – Stefania LaVie Owen, New Zealand-American actress
1998 – Chandler Canterbury, American actor
1999 – Amber Joseph, Barbadian cyclist
2000 – Kayvon Thibodeaux, American football player

Deaths

Pre-1600
 933 – Li Siyuan, Chinese emperor (b. 867)
1025 – Basil II, Byzantine emperor (b. 958)
1072 – Alp Arslan, Turkish sultan (b. 1029)
1161 – Wanyan Liang, Chinese emperor (b. 1122)
1230 – Ottokar I, duke of Bohemia (b. 1155)
1283 – Philip I, Latin emperor (b. 1243)
1343 – Hasan Kucek, Chopanid prince (b. c. 1319)
1467 – Jöns Bengtsson Oxenstierna, archbishop and regent of Sweden (b. 1417)
1574 – Selim II, Ottoman sultan (b. 1524)
1598 – Philips of Marnix, Lord of Saint-Aldegonde, Dutch nobleman (b. 1540)

1601–1900
1621 – Charles d'Albert, duc de Luynes, French courtier, Constable of France (b. 1578)
1673 – Margaret Cavendish, Duchess of Newcastle-upon-Tyne, English noblewoman (b. 1623)
1675 – Johannes Vermeer, Dutch painter and educator (b. 1632)
1683 – Izaak Walton, English author (b. 1593)
1688 – Gaspar Fagel, Dutch lawyer and politician (b. 1634)
  1698   – Louis Victor de Rochechouart de Mortemart, French nobleman (b. 1636)
1715 – George Hickes, English minister and scholar (b. 1642)
1753 – Richard Boyle, 3rd Earl of Burlington, English architect and politician, designed Chiswick House (b. 1694)
1792 – Joseph Martin Kraus, Swedish pianist, violinist, and composer (b. 1756)
1812 – Shneur Zalman, Russian rabbi, author and founder of Chabad (b. 1745)
1817 – Federigo Zuccari, astronomer, director of the Astronomical Observatory of Naples (b. 1783)
1819 – Daniel Rutherford, Scottish chemist and physician (b. 1749)
1855 – Jacques Charles François Sturm, French mathematician and academic (b. 1803)
1878 – Alfred Bird, English chemist and businessman, invented baking powder (b. 1811)
1890 – Sitting Bull, Hunkpapa Lakota tribal chief (b. 1831)

1901–present
1943 – Fats Waller, American singer-songwriter and pianist (b. 1904)
1944 – Glenn Miller, American bandleader and composer (b. 1904)
1947 – Arthur Machen, Welsh journalist and author (b. 1863)
  1947   – Crawford Vaughan, Australian politician, 27th Premier of South Australia (b. 1874)
1950 – Vallabhbhai Patel, Indian lawyer and politician, 1st Deputy Prime Minister of India (b. 1875)
1958 – Wolfgang Pauli, Austrian-Swiss physicist and academic, Nobel Prize laureate (b. 1900)
1962 – Charles Laughton, English-American actor, director, and producer (b. 1899)
1965 – M. Balasundaram, Sri Lankan journalist, lawyer, and politician (b. 1903)
1966 – Keith Arbuthnott, 15th Viscount of Arbuthnott, Indian-Scottish general and politician, Lord Lieutenant of Kincardineshire (b. 1897)
  1966   – Walt Disney, American animator, director, producer, and screenwriter, co-founded The Walt Disney Company (b. 1901)
1968 – Antonio Barrette, Canadian politician, 18th Premier of Quebec (b. 1899)
  1968   – Jess Willard, American boxer and actor (b. 1881)
1969 – Karl Theodor Bleek, German lawyer and politician, 12th Mayor of Marburg (b. 1898)
1971 – Paul Lévy, French mathematician and theorist (b. 1886)
1974 – Anatole Litvak, Russian-American director, producer, and screenwriter (b. 1902)
1977 – Wilfred Kitching, English 7th General of The Salvation Army (b. 1893)
1978 – Chill Wills, American actor (b. 1903)
1980 – Peter Gregg, American race car driver (b. 1940)
1984 – Jan Peerce, American tenor and actor (b. 1904)
1985 – Seewoosagur Ramgoolam, Mauritian physician and politician, 1st Prime Minister of Mauritius (b. 1900)
1986 – Serge Lifar, Russian-French ballet dancer and choreographer (b. 1905)
1989 – Edward Underdown, English actor and jockey (b. 1908)
1991 – Vasily Zaytsev, Russian captain (b. 1915)
1993 – William Dale Phillips, American chemist and engineer (b. 1925)
2000 – Haris Brkić, Bosnian-Serbian basketball player (b. 1974)
2003 – Vincent Apap, Maltese sculptor (b. 1909)
  2003   – George Fisher, American cartoonist (b. 1923)
  2003   – Keith Magnuson, Canadian ice hockey player and coach (b. 1947)
2004 – Vassal Gadoengin, Nauruan educator and politician, Speaker of the Nauru Parliament (b. 1943)
2005 – Heinrich Gross, Austrian physician and psychiatrist (b. 1914)
  2005   – Stan Leonard, Canadian golfer (b. 1915)
  2005   – William Proxmire, American soldier, journalist, and politician (b. 1915)
  2005   – Darrell Russell, American football player (b. 1976)
2006 – Clay Regazzoni, Swiss race car driver (b. 1939)
  2006   – Mary Stolz, American journalist and author (b. 1920)
2007 – Julia Carson, American lawyer and politician (b. 1938)
2008 – León Febres Cordero, Ecuadorian engineer and politician, 46th President of Ecuador (b. 1931)
2009 – Eliza Atkins Gleason, American librarian (b. 1909) 
  2009   – Oral Roberts, American evangelist, founded the Oral Roberts Evangelistic Association (b. 1918)
2010 – Blake Edwards, American director, producer, and screenwriter (b. 1922)
  2010   – Bob Feller, American baseball player and sportscaster (b. 1918)
  2010   – Eugene Victor Wolfenstein, American psychoanalyst and theorist (b. 1940)
2011 – Bob Brookmeyer, American trombone player and composer (b. 1929)
  2011   – Christopher Hitchens, English-American essayist, literary critic, and journalist (b. 1949)
2012 – Owoye Andrew Azazi, Nigerian general (b. 1952)
  2012   – Patrick Ibrahim Yakowa, Nigerian politician, 18th Governor of Kaduna State (b. 1948)
  2012   – Olga Zubarry, Argentinian actress (b. 1929)
2013 – Harold Camping, American evangelist, author, radio host (b. 1921)
  2013   – Joan Fontaine, British-American actress (b. 1917)
  2013   – Dyron Nix, American basketball player (b. 1967)
2014 – Donald Metcalf, Australian physiologist and immunologist (b. 1929)
  2014   – Fausto Zapata,  Mexican journalist, lawyer, and politician, Governor of San Luis Potosí (b. 1940)
2015 – Harry Zvi Tabor, English-Israeli physicist and engineer (b. 1917)
2016 – Craig Sager, American sports journalist (b. 1951)
2017 – Heinz Wolff, scientist and TV presenter (b. 1928)
  2017   – Calestous Juma, academic (b. 1953)
2018 – Eryue He, Chinese historical fiction writer (b.1945) 
  2018   – Girma Wolde-Giorgis, President of Ethiopia (b. 1924)
2020 – Saufatu Sopoanga, Tuvaluan politician, 8th Prime Minister of Tuvalu (b. 1952)

Holidays and observances
Bill of Rights Day (United States)
2nd Amendment Day (South Carolina)
Christian feast day:
Drina Martyrs
Drostan (Aberdeen Breviary)
John Horden and Robert McDonald (Episcopal Church (USA))
Maria Crocifissa di Rosa
Mesmin
Valerian of Abbenza
Virginia Centurione Bracelli
December 15 (Eastern Orthodox liturgics)
Homecoming Day (Alderney)
Kingdom Day (Netherlands), moves to December 16 if the 15th is on a Sunday
Zamenhof Day (International Esperanto Community)

References

External links

 BBC: On This Day
 
 Historical Events on December 15

Days of the year
December